Sergei Vladimirovich Loznitsa (born 5 September 1964) is a Ukrainian director of Belarusian origin known for his documentary as well as dramatic films.

Biography
Loznitsa was born on 5 September 1964 in the city of Baranavichy, in the Byelorussian Soviet Socialist Republic. Later the Loznitsa family moved to Kyiv, Ukrainian Soviet Socialist Republic, where he completed high school.

Loznitsa graduated from Kyiv Polytechnic Institute as a mathematician in 1987. Between 1987 and 1991 he worked at the Institute of Cybernetics, where he developed expert systems, systems of design-making and artificial intelligence. Loznitsa also worked as a translator from Japanese.

In 1991 he enrolled at the Gerasimov Institute of Cinematography, in the fictional-film direction department taught by Nana Jorjadze. He graduated with honors in 1997.

After completion of his studies Loznitsa began working as a documentary film director in Saint Petersburg in 2000. He and his family moved to Germany in 2001. In 2007, Loznitsa travelled to Canada to participate in the first retrospective of his films at Media City Film Festival, representing his first in person visit to North America. This screening and lecture included many of the director's lesser-known short films focussing on his intimate depictions of the former Soviet Europe, including Halt (2000), Portrait (2002), and Factory (2004). Many of Loznitsa's films had North American premieres at Media City Film Festival, including Blockade (2005), Artel (2006), Revue (2008), The Letter (2012) and others before the director began to gain international prominence with major screenings at TIFF, NYFF and elsewhere. 

In 2010 his film My Joy was selected for the main competition at the 2010 Cannes Film Festival. His 2012 film In the Fog competed for the Palme d'Or at the 2012 Cannes Film Festival. Maidan had its world premiere in a special screening at Cannes in May 2014, a record of the 2013–14 popular protests in Kyiv and their violent suppression. His documentary "Babi Yar. Context" was created with help from Babi Yar Holocaust Memorial Center.

On 28 February 2022, Loznitsa resigned from the European Film Academy in response to its statement expressing "solidarity with Ukraine" published days earlier in response to the Russian invasion of Ukraine. In an open letter, Loznitsa condemned the academy for failing "to call a war a war, to condemn barbarity and voice your protest". On 1 March 2022, the academy announced that it would exclude Russian films from its European Film Awards. The same day, Loznitsa spoke against this decision, saying, "many friends and colleagues, Russian filmmakers, have taken a stand against this insane war. ... They are victims as we are of this aggression", and calling to "not judge people based on their passports" but "on their acts".

On 19 March 2022, it was announced that Loznitsa had been expelled from the Ukrainian Film Academy for opposing the boycott of Russian films. The academy stated that Loznitsa had "repeatedly stressed that he considers himself a cosmopolitan, 'a man of the world'. However, now, when Ukraine is struggling to defend its independence, the key concept in the rhetoric of every Ukrainian should be his national identity." Loznitsa issued a statement the same day, saying, "I was astonished to read of the Ukrainian film academy's decision to expel me for being a cosmopolite. ... It is only during the late Stalinist era, from the onset of the antisemitic campaign unleashed by Stalin between 1948 and 1953, that the term acquired a negative connotation in Soviet propaganda discourse. By speaking out against cosmopolitanism, the Ukrainian 'academy members' employ this very discourse invented by Stalin". Loznitsa called the academy's emphasis on the national identity "Nazism" and a "gift to Kremlin propagandists".

Selected filmography

Documentary films 
 2002: Portrait
 2005: Блокада / Blockade
 2014: Майдан / Maidan
 2015: Событие / The Event
 2016: Аустерлиц / Austerlitz
 2018: Процесс / The Trial
 2018: День победы / Victory Day
 2019: Государственные похороны / State Funeral
 2021: Бабий Яр. Контекст / Babi Yar. Context
 2021: Mr. Landsbergis
 2022: The Natural History of Destruction
 2022: The Kiev Trial

Feature films 
 2010: Счастье мое / My Joy
 2012: В тумане / In the Fog
 2014: Мосты Сараево / Bridges of Sarajevo
 2017: Лагідна / Кроткая / A Gentle Creature
 2018: Донбас / Донбасс / Donbass

Awards
 Kraków Film Festival, Bronze Dragon (Segodnya My Postroim Dom, 1996)
 Kraków Film Festival, Golden Dragon - Special Mention (Polustanok, 2000)
 International Short Film Festival Oberhausen, Grand Prize (Portret, 2002)
 Dok Leipzig, Silver Dove (Portret, 2002)
 Karlovy Vary International Film Festival, Best Documentary - Special Mention (Portret, 2003)
 Nika Award Best Documentary (Blokada, 2006)
 Kraków Film Festival, Golden Dragon (Blokada, 2006)
 Karlovy Vary International Film Festival, Best Documentary (Artel, 2007)
 Jihlava International Documentary Film Festival, Best Central and Eastern European Documentary (Artel, 2007)
 Kraków Film Festival, Golden Horn (Predstavlenie, 2008)
 Yerevan International Film Festival, Silver Apricot - Special Prize (My Joy, 2010)
 Kinotavr, Best Direction (My Joy, 2010)
 Tallinn Black Nights Film Festival, Grand Prize (My Joy, 2010)
 Cannes Film Festival, FIPRESCI Award (In the Fog, 2012)
 Yerevan International Film Festival, Golden Apricot (In the Fog, 2012)
 Kraków Film Festival, Golden Dragon (Pismo, 2013)
 Ann Arbor Film Festival, Michael Moore Award (The Event, 2016)
 Traverse City Film Festival, Buzz Wilson Prize (Austerlitz, 2016)
 Cannes Film Festival, Un Certain Regard Award for Best Director (Donbass, 2018)
 Cairo International Film Festival, Silver Pyramid (Donbass, 2018)
 International Film Festival of India, Golden Peacock for Best Film (Donbass, 2018)

References

External links

 

An Interview with Sergei Loznitsa on A Gentle Creature
 (IT) XV - SERGEI LOZNITSA - Rivista Primi Piani

People from Baranavichy
1964 births
Living people
20th-century Ukrainian writers
Ukrainian cinematographers
Ukrainian documentary film directors
Ukrainian film directors
Ukrainian people of Belarusian descent
Laureates of the Oleksandr Dovzhenko State Prize